The Deltona–Daytona Beach–Ormond Beach, Florida Metropolitan Statistical Area is a metropolitan statistical area (MSA) in central and the north portions of Florida consisting of Volusia and Flagler counties in the state of Florida. As of 2013, it is the 88th-largest MSA in the United States, with a census-estimated population of 600,756.

Principal cities and towns
All three principal cities are located in Volusia County.

 City of Daytona Beach
 City of Deltona
 City of Ormond Beach

The city of Palm Coast in Flagler County is the second-largest municipality in the MSA, and the City of Port Orange is larger than Ormond Beach, but neither city qualifies as a principal city.

Commerce
The Volusia/Flagler area is best known for its tourism industry, which attracts millions of visitors each year. Motorsports dominate the area, with several race-track venues as magnets. The best known is Daytona International Speedway, where the headquarters of NASCAR are located. Other racing venues include New Smyrna Speedway and Volusia Speedway Park. Other motorsport events include Daytona Beach Bike Week, a massive biker rally that occurs in March, and several classic-car shows.

The main natural attractions for tourists are the beaches of Volusia and Flagler Counties, with Daytona Beach, Flagler Beach, New Smyrna Beach, and Ormond Beach being the largest draws. Summer is usually the high season for beach tourism in this area.

Transportation

Roads
Limited-access highways in the Volusia/Flagler area include:

  Interstate 95, the main highway through the area, connects with Jacksonville to the north and Miami to the south.
  Interstate 4, which has its eastern terminus at I-95 in Daytona Beach, travels west to connect with Orlando and the Walt Disney World Resort.

Major surface highways include:
  US 1,
  US 17, 
  US 92

Mass transit
Public bus transportation in Volusia County is provided by Volusia County Public Transit System (VOTRAN), which connects all the major cities. Paratransit service is also offered by VOTRAN.

Commuter rail service is provided by SunRail, and the northern terminus is located in DeBary, in Volusia County.

See also
Central Florida
Greater Orlando
Halifax area

References

Volusia County, Florida
Flagler County, Florida
Metropolitan areas of Florida